Edmonton-Manning is a provincial electoral district in Edmonton, Alberta, Canada. It is situated in the northeast quadrant of the city. It was created in 1993 and is mandated to return a single member to the Legislative Assembly. The riding is named after former Social Credit Premier Ernest Manning, who held office from 1943 to 1968. The riding was last contested in the 2019 Alberta election.

History
The electoral district was created in the 1993 boundary redistribution when Edmonton-Belmont was merged with a portion of Edmonton-Beverly. The 2010 boundary redistribution saw some changes made on the south and west boundaries. The first was a minor revision that pushed the south boundary north to 144 Avenue to give some land to Edmonton-Beverly-Clareview. The second revision was made with Edmonton-Decore on the west side that moved a small portion of the west boundary from 59A Street to 66 Street to gain some land from that district. Manning also lost some land to Decore when it expanded the west to 66 Street from 82 Street and north from 137 Avenue to 144 Avenue.

Boundary history

Representation history

The first election contested in the district occurred in 1993. That election saw incumbent Edmonton-Belmont NDP MLA Tom Sigurdson run for a third term in office. He was defeated by Liberal candidate Peter Sekulic, who won over half the popular vote.

Sekulic would not stand for a second term in office. The 1997 election was won by Liberal candidate Ed Gibbons, who defeated Progressive Conservative candidate Tony Vandermeer in a closely contested race. Both candidates ran against each-other again in 2001, during which Vandermeer was elected and Gibbons finished second in the popular vote.

Vandermeer ran for a second term in office in the 2004 election. He was defeated by Liberal candidate Dan Backs, who took the riding with just over 36% of the popular vote. Backs would be expelled from the Liberal caucus on November 20, 2006, and ran for re-election as an independent candidate. He was not re-elected as an independent.

The race in 2008 ended up being closely contested, between candidates from all four major political parties. Backs ended up finishing a close third place. He was defeated by Progressive Conservative candidate Peter Sandhu, who won just under 36% of the popular vote. The second, third and fourth place candidates all finished with just about 2,300 votes.

During the 2015 election, NDP challenger Heather Sweet was elected with 71.5% of the popular vote, defeating Progressive Conservative challenger Gurcharan Garcha who finished second in terms of the popular vote in the riding.

Legislature results

Elections in the 1990s

|}

|}

Elections in the 2000s

|}

|}

|}

Elections in the 2010s

Senate nominee results

2004 Senate nominee election district results

Voters had the option of selecting 4 Candidates on the Ballot

Student Vote results

2004 student election

On November 19, 2004, a Student Vote was conducted at participating Alberta schools to parallel the 2004 Alberta general election results. The vote was designed to educate students and simulate the electoral process for persons who have not yet reached the legal majority. The vote was conducted in 80 of the 83 provincial electoral districts with students voting for actual election candidates. Schools with a large student body that reside in another electoral district had the option to vote for candidates outside of the electoral district then where they were physically located.

2012 student election

References

External links
Website of the Legislative Assembly of Alberta
CBC's 2004 election coverage
CBC's 2008 election coverage

Alberta provincial electoral districts
Politics of Edmonton